Nepenthes × sarawakiensis (after Sarawak, Borneo) is a natural hybrid involving N. muluensis and N. tentaculata. It is quite a rare plant as one of its parent species, N. muluensis, is only known from several isolated mountains.

References
 Adam, J.H., C.C. Wilcock & M.D. Swaine 1992.  Journal of Tropical Forest Science 5(1): 13–25.
 Adam, J.H. & C.C. Wilcock 1993. One new natural hybrid of Nepenthes from Mt. Mulu. The Sarawak Museum Journal 43: 291–294.

 McPherson, S.R. & A. Robinson 2012. Field Guide to the Pitcher Plants of Borneo. Redfern Natural History Productions, Poole.

Carnivorous plants of Asia
sarawakiensis